Romallis Ellis (born December 16, 1965) is an American former professional boxer who competed from 1989 to 2001, challenging for the IBF light middleweight title in 1997. As an amateur, he won the lightweight bronze medal at the 1988 Summer Olympics.

Amateur career
 1988 United States Amateur Lightweight champion
 1988 Olympic Lightweight Bronze Medalist.

1988 Olympic Results

 Round of 64: received a bye
 Round of 32: Defeated Lee Kang-Su (South Korea) by decision, 5-0
 Round of 16: Defeated Kassim Traoré (Mali) referee stopped contest in second round
 Quarterfinal: Defeated Emil Chuprenski (Bulgaria) by decision, 3-2
 Semifinal: Lost to Andreas Zülow (East Germany) by decision, 0-5 (was awarded bronze medal)

Professional career
Ellis began his professional career in 1989 and later moved up two weight classes. He came up short in his only attempt at a major title—a 1997 loss to IBF Light Middleweight titleholder Raúl Márquez via TKO in the fourth round. However, Ellis did outbox the heavily favored Vince Phillips in a non-title bout and earned a victory by decision.  In 1998 Ellis took on Fernando Vargas and was TKO'd in the second round.  Ellis lost his next fight, in 2001, and retired with a record of 24-4-1 with 17 knockouts.

References

External links
 

1965 births
Living people
Boxers from Atlanta
Boxers at the 1988 Summer Olympics
Olympic bronze medalists for the United States in boxing
Winners of the United States Championship for amateur boxers
American male boxers
African-American boxers
Medalists at the 1988 Summer Olympics
Light-welterweight boxers
Lightweight boxers
Light-middleweight boxers
21st-century African-American people
20th-century African-American sportspeople